Harry Hodgkinson (15 March 1913 – 2 October 1994), born Kirkham, Lancashire, was a British writer, journalist, naval intelligence officer and expert on the Balkans.

From the age of 16, he started writing for the Blackpool Times, Yorkshire Observer and Bradford Telegraph. In 1936, he walked from Charing Cross to Jerusalem and published stories from his travels in The Christian Science Monitor, The Times and The Guardian. He was employed by Naval Intelligence at the Admiralty and worked under Ian Fleming, in charge of Albania and Yugoslavia. After the war he was adviser to the Director of Naval Intelligence regarding the Soviet satellite states. In 1954 he published Adriatic Sea, and in 1955 Tito between East and West. He was in correspondence with Edith Durham for many years and received some sixty letters from her. He was appointed from 1985 to be a chairman of the Anglo-Albanian Association.

During his career he supported the Albanian cause and took up strong anti-Serb and anti-Bulgarian positions. He left many unpublished manuscripts about the Balkans.

Works
 West and East of Tito, Gollancz (1952)
 The Adriatic Sea, Macmillan (1956)
 Scanderbeg, The Centre for Albanian Studies/Learning Design; foreword by David Abulafia (1999),

References

External links 
 1945 Harry Hodgkinson: Impressions of Albania published on Robert Elsie's web site

20th-century British writers
1913 births
1994 deaths
Anti-Serbian sentiment
Anti-Bulgarian sentiment
People from Kirkham, Lancashire
English male journalists
Royal Navy officers of World War II
Albania–United Kingdom relations
20th-century English male writers
Writers from Lancashire